

The Rimo Muztagh is one of the most remote subranges of the Karakoram range.  The southern part of Rimo Muztagh is in the Ladakh portion of far northwestern India, also claimed by Pakistan.  The northern half, including the Rimo massif, is in the Siachen area (territory controlled by India). It is far from major towns, and close to the militarily sensitive Siachen Glacier, so it has seen little exploration or climbing activity compared to, for example, the nearby Baltoro Muztagh. The highest peak is Mamostong Kangri, 7,516 metres (24,659 feet).

The Rimo Muztagh is bordered on the north by the Rimo Glacier, which drains to the east into the upper Shyok River, and by the Teram Shehr Glacier, a tributary of the Siachen Glacier. To the northeast lie the Northeast Rimo Mountains and the Karakoram Pass, a pass on one of the historically important trade routes into Central Asia. To the north lies the eastern end of the Siachen Muztagh. On the east side of the range, the upper Shyok River divides it from the Depsang Plains, part of the Tibetan Plateau. On the southeast, the pass known as the Sasser Pass (Saser La) separates the Rimo Muztagh from the Saser Muztagh. The western border of the range is formed by the lower Siachen Glacier and its outflow, the Nubra River. Across this boundary lie the Saltoro Mountains and the Kailas Mountains.

Selected peaks of the Rimo Muztagh
The following is a table of the peaks in the Rimo Muztagh which are over 7,200 meters (23,622 feet) in elevation and have over 500 meters (1,524 feet) of topographic prominence.
(This is a common criterion for peaks of this stature to be independent.)

Other peaks
Other notable peaks include the following:
 Chong Kumdang Ri I, 7,071 m
 Padmanabh / Terong Tower, 7,030 m
 Skyampoche Ri I / Aq Tash I, 7,016 m
 Chong Kumdang Ri II, 7,004 m

External links 
Blankonthemap The Northern Kashmir WebSite

See also
 Karakoram
 List of highest mountains

Sources
 Jerzy Wala, Orographical Sketch Map of the Karakoram, Swiss Foundation for Alpine Research, Zurich, 1990.
 Andy Fanshawe and Stephen Venables, Himalaya Alpine-Style, Hodder and Stoughton, 1995.

Mountain ranges of India
Landforms of Jammu and Kashmir
Mountain ranges of the Karakoram